Allan Winter Rowe (31 July 1879 – 6 December 1934) was an American biochemist and physiological chemist who worked as a professor at Boston University. Although not trained in medicine, he conducted extensive chemical researches relating to human physiology including major works on the endocrine secretions and their role in various disorders.

Rowe was born in Gloucester, Massachusetts to Arthur Howard and Lucy Haskell Rowe. He was educated at the Massachusetts Institute of Technology receiving a BS in 1901 after which he went to the Wesleyan University where he received an MS in 1904. He then went to the University of Göttingen and studied under Walther Nernst, receiving a PhD in 1906. He then continued study at Harvard University under Theodore William Richards. He began to teach chemistry briefly at the Wesleyan University in 1902 but was a faculty at the Boston University from 1906 teaching chemistry.

References 

1879 births
1934 deaths
People from Gloucester, Massachusetts
Wesleyan University faculty